Anaprambal is a sub division of Thalavady village. It is situated on Thiruvalla - Takazhi - Ambalappuzha road in the  Kuttanad area and on the banks of Pampa River. The Sree Dharmasastha Temple is situated here.

References

Villages in Alappuzha district